Edmund Culpeper (1660–1738) was an English scientific instrument maker.

Highly skilled English craftsman. Began his career as an engraver. Later dedicated himself to the construction of scientific instruments, achieving fame principally in the optical and mathematical fields. After making simple microscopes, Culpeper turned to tripod-mounted compound microscopes, introducing major changes and improvements in their mechanical and optical systems. Such instruments are known as "Culpeper-type microscopes".

References 

 Museo Galileo. "Edmund Culpeper". Catalogue of the Museo Galileo's Instruments on Display. catalogue.museogalileo.it
 Perea-Borobio collection. "Edmund Culpeper". Culpeper´s microscope. perea-borobio.com

1660 births
1738 deaths
British scientific instrument makers